Barbara Bielecka (born 1 January 1931, Chełm) is a Polish Functionalist architect and a member of the Faculty of Architecture at the Gdańsk University of Technology. She designed the Sanctuary of Our Lady of Lichen, Poland's largest church, the sixth largest by area in the world. It was constructed between 1994 and 2004. In May 1985, she joined the Commission of Urban Planning and Architecture at the Polish Academy of Sciences in Kraków.

The Basilica of Our Lady of Licheń

References

External links
Regarding the Sanctuary of Our Lady of Lichen
An interview with Barbara Bielecka
A photo of Barbara Bielecka

Women architects
Academic staff of the Gdańsk University of Technology
Polish women architects
1931 births
Living people
Polish women academics
20th-century Polish architects
21st-century Polish architects
20th-century Polish women
People from Chełm